Tuuli Petäjä-Sirén (born 9 November 1983 in Espoo) is a Finnish windsurfer.  She won a silver medal at the 2012 Summer Olympics in the women's RS:X. She was chosen as athlete of the year in Finland in 2012.

At the opening ceremony of the 2016 Summer Olympics Petäjä-Sirén was chosen to carry the Finnish flag. She finished 10th in the women's RS:X.

She has qualified to represent Finland at the 2020 Summer Olympics.

References

External links
 

1983 births
Living people
Female windsurfers
Finnish windsurfers
Finnish female sailors (sport)
Sportspeople from Espoo

Sailors at the 2008 Summer Olympics – RS:X
Sailors at the 2012 Summer Olympics – RS:X
Sailors at the 2016 Summer Olympics – RS:X
Sailors at the 2020 Summer Olympics – RS:X
Olympic sailors of Finland
Olympic silver medalists for Finland
Olympic medalists in sailing
Medalists at the 2012 Summer Olympics